Jamelia – The Collection is the second greatest hits album by British singer and songwriter Jamelia. The album was released on 27 July 2009 on EMI and Emi Gold Records.

Track listing

References

Jamelia compilation albums
2009 compilation albums